Superior gluteal can refer to:
 Superior gluteal artery
 Superior gluteal veins
 Superior gluteal nerve